Antiochus (killed c. 226 BC), called Hierax (Ἱέραξ, "Hawk") for his grasping and ambitious character, was the younger son of Antiochus II and Laodice I and separatist leader in the Hellenistic Seleucid kingdom, who ruled as king of Syria during his brother's reign.

Life

King of Syria

Youngest son of Antiochus II and Laodice I, he was thirteen when his father died in 246 BC. That death led to the Third Syrian War. A year later, probably under the influence of his mother, Antiochus demands the possession of Asia Minor from his brother Seleucus II Callinicus and quickly declares his independence in order to expand his territory and his authority. Seleucus, struggling against the ptolemaic forces, has no choice but to accept.

War of the Brothers

In 241 BC, Seleucus made peace with Ptolemy III Euergetes and then tried to recover the territories his brother took from him. Ready for the war, Hierax sought the help of two strong allies : Mithridates II of Pontus and Ariarathes III of Cappadocia and thus constitutes a vast coalition of Anatolian states : Cappadocia, Bithynia and a certain number of Galatians. After a first loss in Lydia, he decimated his brother's army in the Battle of Ancyra in ca. 239 BC and then ruled over Asia Minor - where he developed a coinage while his brother had to go in Iran to stop a rebellion in Parthia

Against Attalus I

In c. 238, Antiochus and his Galatians allies attacked Pergamon but had to face its powerful ruler Attalus I. Attalus defeated the Gauls and Antiochus at the battle of Aphrodisium and again at a second battle in the east. Subsequent battles were fought and won against Antiochus alone: in Hellespontine Phrygia, where Antiochus was perhaps seeking refuge with his father-in law, Ziaelas of Bithynia; near Sardis in the spring of 228 BC; and, in the final battle of the campaign, further south in Caria on the banks of the Harpasus, a tributary of the Maeander. All his possessions taken away, Antiochus still tried to replace his brother in Syria and Mesopotamia, taking advantage of the fact that his brother was in Iran. He ultimately failed and got killed in Thrace in 226 BC.

Marriage relations 

Antiokhos Hierax had two wives:
- daughter of the ruler of Kappadokia (see Ariarathes III of Cappadocia) whose country he was allied with at least in 230 BCE.
- daughter of king of Bithynia whose country he was also allied with.
Both these were daughters of royal families with whom Hierax allied with, for alliance against his elder brother Seleukos II.

His sister Laodike was married with his ally, king Mithridates II of Pontus.
See also Laodice.

Notes

References

External links
Antiochus Hierax, article in historical sourcebook by Mahlon H. Smith
Antiochus Hierax, list of sources at attalus.org

Seleucid rulers
Year of birth unknown
220s BC deaths